Bhivpuri Road is a railway station on the Central line of the Mumbai Suburban Railway network in India. It is on the Karjat route.  is the previous stop and Karjat is the next stop.

At Bhivpuri, a state highway connects to NH4, Panvel and Navi in one direction and to Badlapur and Thane District in the other. A new multi-facilities hospital at Bhivpuri, Raigad Hospital & Research Center, covers the area from Shelu and Neral to Karjat. There is also a waterfall which is popular for day trips.

Gallery

References 

Railway stations in Raigad district
Mumbai Suburban Railway stations
Mumbai CR railway division
Kalyan-Lonavala rail line